Podolsk is an industrial city, center of Podolsk Urban Okrug, Moscow Oblast, Russia, located on the Pakhra River (a tributary of the Moskva River).

History

The first mentions of the village of Podol, which belonged to the votchina of the Danilov Monastery, are contained in the church letopis of 1627-1628. On October 5, 1781, by the personal decree of Catherine II, the Podolsky Uyezd was formed, and the village of Podol was renamed the city of Podolsk. 

Podolsk land is directly connected with the events of the Patriotic War of 1812. After the Battle of Borodino, the troops under the leadership of Mikhail Kutuzov, passing through Podolsk, took up defensive positions near the village of Krasnaya Pakhra, Podolsk district, then approached Tarutino, setting up a camp here. The famous Tarutino maneuver determined the entire further victorious course of the war with the Napoleonic army. 

After the Patriotic War of 1812, Podolsk and Podolsk uyezd restored and expanded their economic functions, primarily trade. This, in particular, was facilitated by the construction in 1844-1847 of the Warsaw (Brest-Litovsk) highway, as well as the construction of a bridge across the Pakhra river. In the 1840s, 13 manufactories worked in the uyezd. Among the cities near Moscow, Podolsk in the second half of the 19th century stood out with the highest population growth rate. In 1900, the American company "Singer" founded in Podolsk a mechanical plant for the assembly of sewing machines and the production of parts for them and had become one of the city-forming enterprises of Podolsk, causing city's economic growth at the beginning of the 20th century. In 1917 the stone buildings of a realschule, a cinema, a power plant, and a water supply were built, and the number of citizens reached 19 thousand.

In the 1930s, American communist writer Myra Page described Podolsk in her pamphlet Soviet Main Street.

In 1971, Podolsk was awarded the Order of the Red Banner of Labor. In the Soviet times, Podolsk was one of the industrial giants in Moscow Oblast. At that time, more than seventy factories were operating in the city. Most of the citizens were working at these plants. 

Podolsk is the site of the Central Archives of the Russian Ministry of Defence.

Administrative and municipal status
As an administrative division, it is incorporated separately as Podolsk City Under Oblast Jurisdiction - an administrative unit with the status equal to that of the districts. As a municipal division, Podolsk City Under Oblast Jurisdiction is incorporated as Podolsk Urban Okrug.

Twin towns – sister cities

Podolsk is twinned with:

 Amstetten, Austria
 Bălți, Moldova
 Bar, Montenegro
 Barysaw, Belarus
 Kladno, Czech Republic
 Hengyang, China
 Kavarna, Bulgaria
 Kvemo Kartli, Georgia
 Ohrid, North Macedonia
 Saint-Ouen-sur-Seine, France
 Shumen, Bulgaria
 Sukhumi, Abkhazia
 Trier-Saarburg, Germany
 Vanadzor, Armenia
 Warmian-Masurian Voivodeship, Poland

Notable people
 

Andrey Balanov, amateur boxer
Maxim Eprev, professional ice hockey player
Anatoli Izmailov, professional footballer
Lev Korolyov, computer scientist
Viktor Kruglov, football player
Eugenie Leontovich, actress
Sergey Makarov, track and field athlete
Nikolai Potapov, professional boxer
Darya Sagalova, film and stage actress, choreographer
Andrey Smolyakov, actor

Gallery

References

Notes

Sources

Cities and towns in Moscow Oblast
Podolsky Uyezd